The American Indian Law Review (AILR) is a student-run biannual law review affiliated with the University of Oklahoma College of Law. The American Indian Law Review serves as a nationwide scholarly forum for analysis of developments in legal issues pertaining to Native Americans and Indigenous peoples worldwide.

AILR circulates in-depth articles by legal scholars, attorneys and other expert observers. In addition, AILR provides comments and notes written by student members and editors on a variety of Indian law-related topics. 

Every spring AILR hosts one of the nation’s largest symposia on Native American law, in partnership with the University of Oklahoma’s Native American studies department and the Native American Law Students Association.

AILW also hosts an annual American Indian Law Writing Competition for law students that are enrolled in any American Bar Association accredited law school in the United States and Canada. The article winning first place is published in the review and the top three entries receive cash prizes.

AILR was founded in 1973 by students. Approximately 50 OU Law students participate in AILR each academic year.

References

External links
 

1973 establishments in Oklahoma
American law journals
Law journals edited by students
Native American law
Native American studies
University of Oklahoma